Steve Gentle (born 30 May 1955) is an Australian cricketer. He played in two first-class matches for South Australia between 1978 and 1984.

See also
 List of South Australian representative cricketers

References

External links
 

1955 births
Living people
Australian cricketers
South Australia cricketers
Cricketers from Adelaide